Lucinda Dryzek (born 4 August 1991) is an English actress of Polish descent, known for playing Katy Riley in the BBC sitcom Life of Riley and Jasmine Burrows in BBC medical drama Holby City.

Career
She started acting at the age of eight and has since appeared in several film, television and theatre productions. Dryzek played the character Katy in the BBC family sitcom Life of Riley, from 2009 in all three series. She is also known for her role as Young Elizabeth Swann in 2003 film Pirates of the Caribbean: The Curse of the Black Pearl.

Her credits include three British television series, appearances in The Sound of Music, Joseph and the Amazing Technicolor Dreamcoat and several pantomimes, and roles in feature and made-for-television movies. She has also acted in TV series Help! I'm a Teenage Outlaw as Lady Devereux/DeeDee. She had supporting roles in the TV show Five Days and in the film City of Ember.

Dryzek has joined the cast of Holby City as F1 doctor Jasmine Burrows, the half-sister of established character Jac Naylor (Rosie Marcel). She made her first appearance during the episode broadcast on 19 July 2016, and last on 20 June 2017.

Filmography

Film

Television

References

External links
 
 

1991 births
Living people
Alumni of the Sylvia Young Theatre School
English child actresses
English people of Polish descent
English television actresses
People educated at Wycombe High School
People from High Wycombe
Actresses from Buckinghamshire
21st-century English actresses